Himalayacalamus hookerianus   is a species of flowering plant in the family Poaceae found in Nepal, Sikkim, Bhutan, and Assam.

References

External links

Bambusoideae
Flora of Bhutan
Flora of Nepal
Grasses of Asia
Grasses of India